Toyokuni may refer to:

 Utagawa Toyokuni (1769–1825), designer of ukiyo-e Japanese woodblock prints
 Utagawa Toyokuni II (1777–1835), designer of ukiyo-e Japanese woodblock prints, also known as Toyoshige
 Utagawa Toyokuni III (1786–1865), designer of ukiyo-e Japanese woodblock prints, also known as Kunisada
 Toyokuni Fukuma (1893–1942), Japanese sumo wrestler
 Toyokuni Susumu (born 1937), Japanese sumo wrestler
 Toyo Province, or also Toyo Kuni, an old province of Japan, in the areas of Ōita and Fukuoka Prefectures
 Toyokuni Shrine (disambiguation), several Shinto shrines dedicated to shōgun Toyotomi Hideyoshi